Mount Vernon East station is a commuter rail station on the Metro-North Railroad New Haven Line, located in Mount Vernon, New York. The station is the first station north of the junction where the New Haven Line splits from the Harlem Line and is the northernmost station on the line before it changes from third rail power to overhead catenary power, which takes place between the Mount Vernon East and Pelham stations.

Station layout
The station has two high-level side platforms, each 850 feet (10 cars) long, serving the outer of the line's four tracks. The tracks are slightly below ground in a cut; a footbridge connects the platforms and entrances. The main entrances are located on Elm Avenue on the north side of the tracks, and in a parking lot off 1st Street on the south side; a staircase also connects the east end of the southern (northbound) platform to Fulton Avenue.

Bee-Line Bus System busses 53 and 54 stop at the Elm Avenue entrance to the station.
Petrillo Plaza, on East Prospect Avenue slightly west of the station, is a hub for the Bee-Line Bus System. Busses servicing Petrillo Plaza are 7, 40, 41, 42, 43, 52, 55, and 91.

History

The New York, New Haven and Hartford Railroad originally had two stations in Mount Vernon. Mount Vernon (Prospect Avenue) was located between 3rd Avenue and Park Avenue, slightly west of the modern station. It was a transfer point to the New York, Westchester and Boston Railway – one of five NYW&B stations within the city. The station building was destroyed by a fire on March 31, 1957, though trains continued to stop.

Penn Central closed the two stations and replaced them with the Mount Vernon station on December 20, 1972. The new station was built with two high-level  side platforms, allowing the new M2 cars to platform at the station. The two old stations were subsequently demolished.

Stained glass artwork named Tranquility by Marjorie Blackwell was installed in 2001. The station stood in for the Rockville Centre station during the filming of the 2004 movie Eternal Sunshine of the Spotless Mind.

References

External links

Google Maps Street view: Elm Avenue entrance, 1st Street entrance, Fulton Avenue entrance

Metro-North Railroad stations in New York (state)
Stations along New York, New Haven and Hartford Railroad lines
Mount Vernon, New York
Transit centers in the United States
Bus stations in New York (state)
Railway stations in Westchester County, New York
Railway stations in the United States opened in 1972